Samuel Gonzalez Westling (born 1983) is a Swedish politician. He was elected as Member of the Riksdag in September 2022. He represents the constituency of Gävleborg County. He is affiliated with the Left Party.

References 

Living people
1983 births
Place of birth missing (living people)
21st-century Swedish politicians
Members of the Riksdag 2022–2026
Members of the Riksdag from the Left Party (Sweden)